Robert Blyth Tait  (born 10 May 1961) is a New Zealand equestrian. Tait has competed at four Olympics and has won four medals, one of only four New Zealanders to do so.

Tait's first success at international level was at the 1990 World Equestrian Games in Stockholm, when he won Gold in both the individual and team events riding Messiah. At the 1992 Olympics in Barcelona he won Bronze in the individual event after teammate Vicky Latta knocked down a rail in the showjumping, and Silver in the team event with Latta and Andrew Nicholson (Mark Todd was also in the team but was not awarded a medal as he did not finish the event). At the 1996 Summer Olympics in Atlanta he won Gold in the individual and Bronze in the Team event. Tait repeated his World Championships double Gold effort at Rome in 1998 riding Ready Teddy. He was flag-bearer for the New Zealand team at the 2000 Summer Olympics but he was eliminated in both the individual and team events. Tait completed his competitive Olympic career with a fifth in the team event at the 2004 Summer Olympics in Athens. He was the eventing manager for the 2008 Summer Olympics.

In the 1993 Queen's Birthday Honours, Tait was appointed a Member of the Order of the British Empire, for services to equestrian sport.

Olympic record
1992: individual bronze; team silver (both on Messiah)
1996: individual gold (on Ready Teddy); team bronze (on Chesterfield)
2000: individual did not finish (on Welton Envoy); team did not finish (on Ready Teddy)
2004: individual 18th; team 5th (both on Ready Teddy)

Personal life
Tait is homosexual.

Notes and references

1961 births
Living people
New Zealand event riders
New Zealand LGBT sportspeople
Olympic bronze medalists for New Zealand
Olympic equestrians of New Zealand
New Zealand male equestrians
Olympic gold medalists for New Zealand
Olympic medalists in equestrian
Olympic silver medalists for New Zealand
Equestrians at the 1992 Summer Olympics
Equestrians at the 1996 Summer Olympics
Equestrians at the 2000 Summer Olympics
Equestrians at the 2004 Summer Olympics
Sportspeople from Whangārei
Gay sportsmen
LGBT equestrians
Medalists at the 1996 Summer Olympics
Medalists at the 1992 Summer Olympics
21st-century New Zealand LGBT people